Snowdown is a hamlet near Dover in Kent, England. It was the location of one of the four chief collieries of the Kent coalfield, which closed in 1987.

The population of the village is included in the civil parish of Aylesham, Kent. As a result, Snowdown is served by Aylesham Parish Council. The District Authority is Dover District Council and the County Authority is Kent County Council. There are roughly 54 houses in Snowdown.

History 
In April 2021, Snowdown was the scene of the death of Julia James. The PCSO was found dead in woodland.

See also
Snowdown railway station
Snowdown Colliery Railway

References

External links

Villages in Kent
Dover District